Danielle Michelle Gibbons (born 31 July 1992) is an English footballer who played as a goalkeeper for Blackburn Rovers of the FA Women's National League North. In 2015 Gibbons required surgery to remove a vestibular schwannoma, which made her deaf in her left ear. Gibbons began her career with Preston North End and was signed by Liverpool ahead of the inaugural 2011 season of the FA Women's Super League. She was Liverpool's longest-serving player by the time she left the club for Sheffield, following the FA WSL Spring Series. In 2018 she signed for Blackburn Rovers.

References

External links
 
 Liverpool LFC player profile 
 
 

1992 births
Living people
English women's footballers
Women's association football goalkeepers
Liverpool F.C. Women players
Women's Super League players
FA Women's National League players
Fylde Ladies F.C. players
Blackburn Rovers L.F.C. players
Footballers from Preston, Lancashire
Deaf association football players
Sheffield F.C. Ladies players
Universiade gold medalists for Great Britain
Universiade medalists in football
Medalists at the 2013 Summer Universiade